The 2012 Road America Road Race Showcase was a multi-class sports car and GT motor race held at Road America in Wisconsin, United States on August 18, 2012. It was the seventh round of the 2012 American Le Mans Series season and the 45th race in the combined history of sportscar races associated with the Road America 500. The race was held over a four-hour period, during which 101 laps of the 6.5-kilometer circuit were completed for a race distance of 658 kilometers.

A year after Muscle Milk Pickett Racing team had beaten the Dyson Racing Team by less than 0.2 seconds, Dyson Racing Team beat the Muscle Milk team by less than 0.1 seconds, giving Dyson Racing Team its first victory at Road America. Lucas Luhr in the Muscle Milke HPD ARX-03a overtook Guy Smith's Lola B12/60 at the final corner of the race only for Smith to win the drag race to the finish line. It was Chris Dyson and Guy Smith's first victory at Road America. Dyson and Smith had overcome a rear of grid start after missing qualifying due to gearbox failure. Dyson Racing Team's second Lola-Mazda of Michael Marsal, Eric Lux and Tony Burgess finished in third place behind Luhr and Klaus Graf.

The season's first championship was decided in Prototype Challenge. When Alex Popow, Tom Kimber-Smith and Jon Bennett won the class in fifth position outright, CORE Autosport secured the teams championship in Prototype Challenge. Just ahead of them in fourth place were the P2 class winners, Conquest Endurance's Martin Plowman and David Heinemeier Hansson in their Morgan LMP2. It was their second class win, and the team's biggest victory to date.

Thirteenth outright was the best of the GTs. BMW Team RLL took their second win of the year with Bill Auberlen and Jörg Müller joining their BMW M3-equipped teammates as winners in 2012. Second was Porsche team Flying Lizard Motorsports of Jörg Bergmeister and Patrick Long with Extreme Speed Motorsports Ferrari of Scott Sharp and Johannes van Overbeek.

GT Challenge was claimed when the Alex Job Racing Porsche of Cooper MacNeil and Leh Keen crossed the line in 25th position.

31 of the 35 entries were running at the race's conclusion.

Race result
Class winners are in bold.  Cars failing to complete 70% of their class winner's distance are marked as Not Classified (NC).

References

Road America
Road America 500
Road Race Showcase